Kristin Korb is an American jazz double bassist and vocalist.

Biography

Korb studied at Eastern Montana College and the University of California, San Diego. She also studied with Ray Brown, with whom she made her recording debut, released in 1996.

Since moving to Los Angeles in 2002, she has performed across North America. She taught at Azuza Pacific and University Southern California, where she was coordinator of vocal jazz studies. After getting married in July 2011 to a Dane, Morten Stove, co-founder of DPA Microphones, she moved to Copenhagen, Denmark.

She has performed and recorded with jazz artists such as Llew Matthews, Kim Richmond, Steve Barnes, Ray Brown, Jeff Hamilton, Bruce Forman, Sheila Jordan, Jan Lundgren, Alex Riel, Harry Allen, Aaron Serfaty, Otmaro Ruíz, Mary Fettig, Karl-Martin Almqvist, Mathias Heise and Jacob Fischer. She plays in a Trio with Snorre Kirk on drums and Magnus Hjorth on piano.

Discography
 Introducing Kristin Korb with Ray Brown (Telarc, 1996)
 Where You'll Find Me (Double K Music, 2001)
 Why Can't You Behave (Double K Music, 2006)
 Get Happy with Todd Johnson (Grace Base, 2006)
 In the Meantime (Double K Music, 2009)
 What's Your Story (Double K Music, 2013)
 Finding Home (Double K Music, 2014)
 That Time of Year (Storyville, 2018)
 What If? / Why Not? (Double K Music, 2021)

References

External links
 Official site
 Interview with Kristin Korb at All About Jazz
 Kristin Korb in San Diego January 2011, All About Jazz
 Jazz Times review of What's Your Story, 2013
 "Meet Kristin Korb", Bass Musician

Living people
University of California, San Diego alumni
University of Southern California faculty
American jazz double-bassists
American women jazz singers
American jazz singers
21st-century double-bassists
Year of birth missing (living people)
American women academics
21st-century American women